Herbert Wallace Tullgren (July 5, 1889 - February 23, 1944) was an American architect active throughout 1910s-1930s. He was centered in Milwaukee, Wisconsin, but his work can be seen in different locations throughout Wisconsin such as Whitefish Bay, Waukesha, Shorewood, and Fond du Lac. His designs made use of Art Deco and Art Moderne, which was popular during the time.

Biography
Tullgren was born in Chicago, Illinois, in July 1889, the second child to Martin and Barbara (née Kregness) Tullgren. During 1894, Martin Tullgren caught the gold rush fever, and left Chicago with his family to become a prospector in Black Hills, South Dakota. Later, he would work as a superintendent of the mines for the Storm Cloud Mining Company in Arizona. The family lived in Maple Gulch on Crown King road, about 11 miles southeast of Prescott, Yavatapi Territory, Arizona, and used a mule as a means of transportation. By the end of the Tullgren's time in Arizona, Martin worked at Homestake Mining Company building and assisting in timbering, and supporting of galleries.

In 1900, the family moved back to Chicago, where Martin, along with Chicagoan partner Archibald “Archie” Hood, set up their own practice, Hood & Tullgren. The pair received contracts from people/companies such as Chief Justice Fuller, Montgomery Ward & Co., and other leading firms in Chicago. By 1902, they had moved their business, and Martin's family including Herbert, to Milwaukee. Herbert, under Hood & Tullgren, began his architectural training with his father, which proved to be the only formal architectural education he would receive.

In 1907, Herbert left Milwaukee to attend Staunton Military Academy in Staunton, Virginia. However, he only spent a year there. Afterwards, he began work as a draftsman with his father's partnership, Hood & Tullgren. By 1909, the partnership had dissolved, and Martin began a new practice, Martin Tullgren & Sons, with both sons, Sven Minard and Herbert. Herbert only took a short break from 1917 to 1919, when he joined the Wisconsin State Guard as a Captain-Adjutant.Under Martin, the firm had built buildings such as the Downer Theater, Astor on the Lake, and Hotel Retlaw. However, by 1922 Martin, who had been ill for several months, died at the age of 64, leaving Herbert to take charge of the office. This included design, office practice, and supervision. Thus making him president of the firm by 1926 to 1936, before the business dissolved.

During the 1920s, Herbert also started other companies alongside the family firm. In 1923, he founded the Terra Company, a real estate company, along with Minard as president, and carpenter Emil Grossmann as vice president. Then sometime in 1927 or 1928, he founded Herbert W & S. Minard Tullgren, Inc., another real estate company. This put Herbert as president, and Minard as vice president. However, in 1928 after Minard's death, Pansy, Minard's widow, became vice president of Herbert W & S. Minard Tullgren, Inc. While Herbert remained president of that company, he became the treasurer of Terra Co., and Emil Grossmann became president.

By the 1930s, Herbert was a well established architect having built multiple office buildings, apartments, hotels, theaters, and even schools. In the early 1930s, Herbert shifted his sights more on building affordable middle to working class urban housing. He even patented, Patent No. 1896734, the duplex (two-story) apartment design, in 1933 after finishing the Viking Apartments in 1931. Herbert was sure of the economic and functional advantages. The Viking Apartments proved this by setting a record for Occupancy During Hard Times at 92%, when the national average for apartment was only about 60%. The Viking Apartments are also shown to be the only architecture that the Fylgia Corporation, a company formed in 1931 with C.E. Look and Elmer A Johnson with Herbert as president, had built.

Confident in the benefits of duplex apartments, Herbert published a pamphlet in 1937,The Tullgren Plan for City Housing, to further describe the social and economic benefits. The floor plans included a living room, dining room, and a kitchen on one floor, and sleeping quarters and a bathroom on the floor above. Public corridors were not required on the sleeping quarters floor, and thus creating more space. In fact, it would create 15% more space, oppose to a conventional single floor apartment. By cutting down corridor space that would have needed to be furnished, equipped, heated, lit, and cleaned it would save 20%  in maintenance cost. Since sleeping quarters were adjoined with the other sleeping quarters, it would create minimum sound from the other parts of the apartments. Overall, the project would cut construction cost by at least 15%, and still provide liquidating income, and profit owners.

Along with this pamphlet was a description of the Tullgren Plan Residence Apartment. The plan was seven apartment buildings within the same area. Each apartment was placed so each family would receive maximum sunlight and air. The buildings would’ve also occupied 22% less land, creating more open space around each building. More space meant more things to do with the landscaping. Tullgren's plan for the outside included a sunken garden cour, pool, flower garden, shaded lawn, and promenade. There would have also been a playground area for small children between the buildings, and facilities for  larger children. The playground would’ve included the usual playground equipment like swings, sand pits, shallow wading pools,  and a camp-fire space. With the open space between buildings, it also allotted space for laundry drying yards. Tullgren saw the possibilities to do the project in a plot of 206,965 square feet, offering maximum housing at a minimum cost. Herbert's ideal was with careful planning and some government assistance would amount to a great deal of affordable housing at a reasonable profit.

This mindset helped Herbert become an associated architect on the Parklawn Public Housing Project during the mid-1930s. Parklawn was endorsed by the administration of Daniel Hoan, Mayor of Milwaukee. It included the Allied Architects of Milwaukee, an association of Milwaukee's finest architects, which included Gerrit J de Gelleke, Peter Brust, A.C. Eschweiler, Herbert Tullgren, R.A. Messner, and Phelps Wyman. The project took the vacant spot at Hope Avenue between Sherman Boulevard and North 47th street. This area was selected because it didn't involve a condemnation of any private property. Parklawn included 64 fireproof buildings with 518 units of 3, 4, or 5 room rentals. To this day, Parklawn is still owned and leased by the Housing Authority of the City of Milwaukee.

By 1938, Herbert published his own magazine that was oversaw by his company, and at his own expense called Architecture and Design. The magazine was a showcase of not only Tullgren's office, but the contractors he worked with. Architecture and Design was aimed to promote their work in hopes of gaining more business.

However, Herbert's last documented building in Milwaukee was built in 1937, the Badger Mutual Insurance Company building. Shortly thereafter, in 1944, Herbert died at the age of 54 from heart disease. He left behind a son, Herbert A. Tullgren, two daughters, Mary and Allison, and his wife Eloise A., who would take over the last of his business concerns.

Architecture Design/Style 

The consistent architectural style under Hood & Tullgren was Neoclassical, a design that would be rarely seen in Herbert's own work later on. When Martin, Herbert's father, started his own business, the style changed to Revival, Tudor Revival and Georgian. By the time, Herbert was head of the company, the style changed to Herbert's trademark style, Art Deco and Art Moderne. This occurred around 1928, when Herbert wanted to embrace modernity that was happening in the urban areas of America after 1925. With this he often incorporated terra cotta ornamentation. Something else that was emphasized in Herbert's work was the detail through contrast, especially during the 1930s. Herbert designed apartments with the ideal to help relieve the growing housing crisis during the 1930s. He emphasized affordability for both tenants and owners. Since during the mid-1930s, Americans had felt that free market became incapable of supplying adequate affordable housing for them.

This contrast can be seen in the Viking Apartments. The Viking shows contrast between the light-colored brick that was aligned through vertical stripes using black stone and steel window sash. Another example is the Hathaway Towers (ca. 1931). The skeletal structure is cream city brick, blonde brick. The corners of the brick are rounded with no projecting cornice, this continues with the circular lobby with terrazzo floor. However within the lobby, the trim done in silver and black, contrasting against the blonde brick.

A notable project for Tullgren is the 1260 Exton Apartments. Built in 1937, it is claimed to be the best preserved and sophisticated example of Art Moderne in the country. Another duplex apartment structure, it takes advantage of the interior stacking function, which creates view-orienting spaces. Herbert built the Exton with grouping of bedrooms on alternate floors with the public corridors, entries, and living space on the floor below. The method behind this was the advantage of the use of skip-stop elevator. This reduces the capital and maintenance costs of the public areas by half. The use of the duplex plan allowed Herbert to eliminate long public corridors, private halls, and passageways. All rooms have direct access to one central stair hall. Grouped around the central service stacks were the kitchen and baths, that permitted economical structure. The apartment has a reinforced concrete structure, the elevators are flanked by fire towers, and there is sound insulation provided by the double walls between each unit and public spaces.

Memberships 
Herbert Tullgren in his later life belonged to many different clubs and organizations. Herbert was a member of the Masonic Order, Kenwood Lodge, Ivanhoe Commandery, and Tripoli Temple. He also belonged to the University Club of Milwaukee. Tullgren was part of architectural clubs such as American Institute of Architects and the State Association of Wisconsin Architects. In addition, he was president of The Bluemound Country Club, the Wisconsin Golf Association, and the Gyro Club. He even held other positions such as secretary for the Prospect Park Co.

Tullgren v. School District
Tullgren v. School District was a court case that occurred after Tullgren's death, but dealt with agreements he made with the Whitefish Bay school district. In 1929, Whitefish Bay entered into a signed contract with Herbert to draft and prepare plans for a new high school. However, the district couldn't afford the entire cost at once. Thus, the payments were divided into 5 different units designated by letter “A” through “E,” and Tullgren would be paid 2% of the estimated cost of the entire building with additional fees.

By 1931, the original agreement was cancelled, and replaced with a new agreement. Prior to this, Tullgren was paid $35,000, which in the new agreement was credited to the school. Actual construction costs and adjustments were made accordingly. The agreement also stated in case of Tullgren's death, his personal representative would have the right to give the contract to another architect that was experienced in school-building, and was approved by the school district. The new architect would have to agree to the terms brought forth by the 1931 agreement.

In June 1941, the 1931 agreement was modified. There was contemplation on architectural service to be furnish by Tullgren in one unit. This would replace or substitute for unit “C.” With this, no issues were raised about the transaction.

When Tullgren died in 1944, his wife, Eloise, became the sole beneficiary, and was appointed as executor of his will and estate.  By December, Eloise assigned the right, title, and interest of Herbert to William J. Herbst. This included the contracts of 1931 and 1941. With this, Herbst and Eloise entered into another separate agreement stating Herbst could not assign or abandon any contract or agreement made by him and the school district. Herbst also could not make any settlement with the district for less than the contracted price without Eloise's consent. Herbst was to pay Eloise a percent of the fees he would make as the new architect for the school. If the school district were to breach either contracts, whether existing or new, Herbst was required to take action to enforce claims. If Herbst refused, Eloise could commence said action. However, Eloise did still reserve the title to the original plans, specifications, work sheets, drawings, and other documents that Tullgren prepared with connection to the school district. These items were available to Herbst to use.

In 1948, the school district and Herbst entered into a new agreement, which provided the 1931 and 1941 contracts should be terminated and take the place by this contract. Herbst was employed to perform architectural service. However, this included construction on the gymnasium, referred to in unit “C,’ and the swimming pool referred to in unit “D.’

By 1956, the school district, unknown to Eloise, entered into a separate agreement with other architects relating to the new high school. The architects were to engage in the construction of additions to the new school. A year later, in 1957, Eloise filed a claim against the village of Whitefish Bay. These claims were rejected since the school district was not liable to Eloise because the contracts were made with her husband, not her. Even Herbst denied to bring action against Whitefish Bay, and disclaimed liability to Eloise as well. To not deprive Eloise her rights, the 1948 contract was executed, and each party related back to the 1931 and 1941 contracts. There was an understanding between Herbst and the school district that future architectural services were to be performed by him. This included additions.  Eloise claimed the school district breached the agreement between her and Herbst. Thus Herbst was liable to her for damages.  However, Eloise, the complaint, did not state facts sufficient enough to constitute a cause of action. By 1958, the demurrer of the school was sustained, and the demurrer of Herbst was overruled.

Works 
A number of his works are listed on the U.S. National Register of Historic Places.
Works include (with attribution):

References

Architects from Wisconsin
20th-century American architects
People from Chicago
Architects from Illinois
1889 births
1944 deaths